Charleston High School is a public high school that serves 313 students from grades 9–12, located in Charleston, Missouri. The principal is Jamarcus Williams.

Athletics
Charleston has won 12 Missouri state high school boys basketball championships: 1975, 1980, 1983, 1986, 1987, 1989, 1990, 1992, 1996, 2007, 2012 and 2022.  In addition, Charleston has finished in 2nd through 4th place 12 times in the state basketball championships from 1977 through 2020.
Their basketball program has produced Ricky Frazier who was the 26th over all pick in the 1982 NBA draft to the Chicago Bulls.  Their baseball program has produced professional athlete Matt Whiteside and James Naile. The football program produced Charlie Babb. Babb was a safety with the Miami Dolphins football team 1972–79 and was on the team that won the Super Bowl.

Activities
Charleston High School offers multiple clubs and activities, including marching band, library club, National Honor Society and Students Against Drunk Driving.

Notable alumni
Matt Whiteside, Former MLB player (Texas Rangers, Philadelphia Phillies, San Diego Padres, Atlanta Braves, Toronto Blue Jays)
Charlie Babb, Former NFL player
James Naile, MLB pitcher for the St. Louis Cardinals

References

External links
Charleston H.S.
Charleston R-1 Public School

Public high schools in Missouri
Schools in Mississippi County, Missouri